Joyce Kalu (born 25 September 1970) is a Nigerian actress, film producer and director in the Nigerian Film Industry.

Biography

Joyce Kalu was born on 25 September 1970 in Ohafia, Abia State, South Eastern Nigeria. The last daughter in a family of nine, she is now married with three children.

Education 
Kalu's primary and secondary education was in Abia State, Nigeria. She also has a Bachelor's degree in Marketing, which she obtained from the Lagos State University (LASU). Kalu also has a diploma in Computer Science.

Career
Joyce Kalu started her acting career in 2005. She became prominent after featuring in a Nollywood movie Take me Home. She is also a business woman.

In 2018 Joyce Kalu featured alongside Rita Dominic, Enyinna Nwigwe and other Nollywood actors in an award winning movie Bound, which was produced by Lilian Afegbi. Bound won the Africa Magic Viewers' Choice Awards (AMVCA) 2018 for Best Indigenous Language (Igbo).

Based on her involvement in the Nigerian Film Industry, community and charity organizations, she was honored with a chieftaincy  title of Apunawu I of Ohafia Community, Abia State by His Royal Paramount Ezieogo, Prof. U I.E. Imaga alongside the entire Ohafia monarchy. She was conferred with the chieftaincy title on January 1, 2016.

Joyce Kalu received an honorary award from the Niger Delta Icon and Dynamic Awards (NDID) as the Most Influential Actress of the year (2020).

Selected filmography 

Take me Home (2007)
Obianama (2018)
Oderi gwugwu(2018)
Isioma Scotland (2018)
Bound (2018)

References

External links
Joyce Kalu on IMDb

Nigerian film actresses
Living people
1970 births
21st-century Nigerian actresses
Lagos State University alumni
Actresses from Abia State
Igbo people
Nigerian film directors
Nigerian film producers
Nigerian women in business
Nigerian businesspeople